Professor Marcus Byrne won the 2013 Ig Nobel Prize for Biology/Astronomy along with: Marie Dacke, Emily Baird, Clarke Scholtz, and Eric Warrant, for discovering that when dung beetles get lost, they can navigate their way home by looking at the Milky Way. This research has practical applications, for example helping how to develop complex visual systems.

References

External links
Staff page at Wits University
Personal page at the National Research Foundation (South Africa)

Living people
Alumni of the University of London
South African entomologists
South African zoologists
Academic staff of the University of the Witwatersrand
University of the Witwatersrand alumni
Year of birth missing (living people)